The Underwater Escape Training Unit is a military training centre for survival at sea in Somerset; the site is mainly for helicopter aircrew.

History
The purpose-built site in Somerset opened in 1985. The Royal Navy previously had underwater breathing training for fixed-wing aircrew at the Royal Navy Air Medical School and had underwater escape for helicopter aircrew in a dunker at HMS Vernon; HMS Vernon trained around 800 rotary wing aircrew a year, and had five naval divers. Civilian offshore workers in the UK are also trained at a dunker in Aberdeen. The 1985 site trained up to 1200 rotary wing aircrew a year.

Aircrew carry STASS (Short Term Air Supply System). Other countries have the Helicopter Aircrew Breathing Device (HABD). STASS was introduced into the Fleet Air Arm in 1992.

The new £15m Underwater Escape Training Unit opened on 27 February 2018. The UETU can train up to 6000 aircrew a year.

Training
The site offers tri-service training for the Royal Navy, Royal Air Force and the Army Air Corps. Foreign countries also train at the dunker too. Fleet Air Arm pilots on Air 424 spend a week at the dunker, and must attend refresher courses every three years.

For STASS training, there is a recompression chamber (diving chamber). There is a HUET system for the Lynx which seats eight, and one for the larger helicopters which seats twelve. There is buoyant ascent training.

Structure

It is situated off the B3151 (former A303), in South Somerset. The dunker operates from Monday to Friday all year. Every three months there is one week of diving training at the site.

There is a 5-metre-deep Dunker pool, a 4-metre-deep Survival Equipment pool, and a 3-metre-deep Short Term Air Supply System pool.

See also
 Defence Survive, Evade, Resist, Extract Training Organisation in Cornwall, also home of the School of Air/Sea Rescue and the Survival and Rescue Mobile Instruction Unit
 Lifeboat College at Poole in Dorset, has a similar Sea Survival Centre
 The US Marines have a similar dunker at Marine Corps Base Camp Lejeune
 :Category:Underwater diving emergency procedures

References

External links
 Royal Navy

Buildings and structures in South Somerset
Diving organizations
Education in Somerset
Military installations established in 1985
Naval aviation units and formations of the United Kingdom
Naval aviation education
Naval education and training in the United Kingdom
Organisations based in Somerset
Sea rescue in the United Kingdom
Survival training
Underwater diving in the United Kingdom
Underwater diving training organizations
1985 establishments in the United Kingdom